Eorlingas may refer to:
The Rohirrim, a nation of Men from J. R. R. Tolkien's novel The Lord of the Rings
The 6th century Anglian tribe after which the village of Arlingham was named 

Eorlingas